Vaikom Chandrasekharan Nair (1920 – 12 April 2005), popularly known as Vaikom, was an Indian writer and journalist who wrote primarily in Malayalam. He was born in Vaikom, a village in Kottayam district of Kerala.

Career
He started writing early in his life and became an activist of the communist party during his college days. Though by career he was a journalist, Vaikkom was a multi-faceted person – a poet, playwright, novelist, actor, orator, singer, artist, and activist. He has been the editor of  various magazines such as Janayugam, Malayala Manorama, Kerala Bhooshanam, Kaumudi, Pouraprabha, Kunkumam, Chithrakarthika, Kumari, and Keralam.

Some of his famous novels like Nakhangal, Panchavankadu and Madhavikkutty have been turned into movies. The play Jathugriham was given the Kerala Sahithya Academy award in 1980. He was chairman of Kerala Sangeetha Nadaka Academy from 1978 to '81. In 1999 he was given the Kerala Sahithya Academy Award for lifetime contribution. Vaikkom has written more than 60 books

Major works
Kuttavum Shikshayum
Alohari
Thanneerpanthal
Mississ Mayavathy
Nakhangal
Panchavankadu
Madhavikkutty
Smrithikavyam
Ashramam
Mamanka rathri
Jathugriham (Play)
Anubhavangale Nandi (Autobiography)
Gothradaham (Novel)
Kayeente Vamsham
Swathi Thirunal

References

Indian communists
Malayali people
People from Vaikom
Malayalam-language writers
1920 births
Year of death missing
Recipients of the Kerala Sahitya Akademi Award
Malayalam-language dramatists and playwrights
Indian male dramatists and playwrights
20th-century Indian dramatists and playwrights
Indian Communist writers
Indian autobiographers
20th-century Indian biographers
Dramatists and playwrights from Kerala
Novelists from Kerala